The following is a list of FCC-licensed radio stations in the U.S. state of North Dakota, which can be sorted by their call signs, frequencies, cities of license, licensees, and programming formats.

List of radio stations

Defunct

References 

 
North Dakota